Sandu Tăbârcă, sometimes written Tăbîrcă, (born 11 July 1965) is a Romanian football manager and former player.

External links
 Sandu Tăbârcă este noul antrenor principal al echipei Gloria Bistrița
 Gloria i-a încheiat contractul de muncă lui Sandu Tăbârcă

1965 births
Living people
Sportspeople from Timișoara
Romanian footballers
Liga II players
Liga III players
CSP UM Timișoara players
SKU Amstetten players
Association football forwards
Romanian football managers
ACF Gloria Bistrița managers
FC Rapid București managers
Expatriate footballers in Austria
Romanian expatriate sportspeople in Austria